Argininosuccinate synthase or synthetase (ASS) is an enzyme that catalyzes the synthesis of argininosuccinate from citrulline and aspartate.  In humans, argininosuccinate synthase is encoded by the ASS gene located on chromosome 9.

ASS is responsible for the third step of the urea cycle and one of the reactions of the citrulline-NO cycle.

Expression 

The expressed ASS gene is at least 65 kb in length, including at least 12 introns. In humans, ASS is expressed mostly in the cells of the liver and kidney.

Mechanism 

In the first step of the catalyzed reaction, citrulline attacks the α-phosphate of ATP to form citrulline adenylate, a reactive intermediate. The attachment of AMP to the ureido (urea-like) group on citrulline activates the carbonyl center for subsequent nucleophilic attack. This activation facilitates the second step, in which the α-amino group of aspartate attacks the ureido group. Attack by aspartate is the rate-limiting step of the reaction. This step produces free AMP and L-argininosuccinate.

Thermodynamically, adenylation of the citrulline ureido group is more favorable than the analogous phosphorylation. Additionally, attack by citrulline at the α-phosphate of ATP produces an equivalent of pyrophosphate, which can be hydrolyzed in a thermodynamically favorable reaction to provide additional energy to drive the adenylation.

Structure

Quaternary 

Argininosuccinate synthetase is a homotetramer, with each subunit consisting of 412 residues. The interfaces between subunits contain a number of salt bridges and hydrogen bonds, and the C-terminus of each subunit is involved in oligomerization by interacting with the C-termini and nucleotide-binding domains of the other subunits.

Active site 

X-ray crystal structures have been generated for argininosuccinate synthetase from Thermus thermophilus, E. coli, Thermotoga maritime, and Homo sapiens. In ASS from T. thermophilus, E. coli, and H. sapiens, citrulline and aspartate are tightly bound in the active site by interactions with serine and arginine residues; interactions of the substrates with other residues in the active site vary by species. In T. thermophilus, the ureido group of citrulline appears to be repositioned during nucleophilic attack to attain sufficient proximity to the α-phosphate of ATP.  In E. coli, it is suggested that binding of ATP causes a conformational shift that brings together the nucleotide-binding domain and the synthetase domain. An argininosuccinate synthetase structure with a bound ATP in the active site has not been attained, although modeling suggests that the distance between ATP and the ureido group of citrulline is smaller in human argininosuccinate synthetase than in the E. coli variety, so it is likely that a much smaller conformational change is necessary for catalysis. The ATP binding domain of argininosuccinate synthetase is similar to that of other N-type ATP pyrophosphatases.

Function 

Argininosuccinate synthetase is involved in the synthesis of creatine, polyamines, arginine, urea, and nitric oxide.

Arginine synthesis 

The transformation of citrulline into argininosuccinate is the rate-limiting step in arginine synthesis. The activity of argininosuccinate synthetase in arginine synthesis occurs largely in at the outer mitochondrial membrane of periportal liver cells as part of the urea cycle, with some activity occurring in cortical kidney cells.{ Genetic defects that cause incorrect localization of argininosuccinate synthetase to the outer mitochondrial membrane cause type II citrullinemia.

In fetuses and infants, arginine is also produced via argininosuccinate synthetase activity in intestinal cells, presumably to supplement the low level of arginine found in mother's milk. Expression of argininosuccinate synthetase in the intestines ceases after two to three years of life.

It is thought that regulation of argininosuccinate synthetase activity in arginine synthesis occurs primarily at the transcriptional level in response to glucocorticoids, cAMP, glucagon, and insulin. It has also been demonstrated in vitro that arginine down-regulates argininosuccinate synthetase expression, while citrulline up-regulates it.

Citrulline-NO cycle 

The enzyme endothelial nitric oxide synthase produces nitric oxide from arginine in endothelial cells. Argininosuccinate synthetase and argininosuccinate lyase recycle citrulline, a byproduct of nitric oxide production, into arginine. Since nitric oxide is an important signaling molecule, this role of ASS is important to vascular physiology. In this role, argininosuccinate synthetase activity is regulated largely by inflammatory cellular signal molecules such as cytokines.

In endothelial cells, it has been shown that ASS expression is increased by laminar shear stress due to pulsative blood flow. Emerging evidence suggests that ASS may also be subject to regulation by phosphorylation at the Ser-328 residue by protein kinase C-α and by nitrosylation at the Cys-132 residue by nitric oxide synthase.

Role in disease

Citrullinemia 

Citrullinemia is an inherited autosomal recessive disease. At least 50 mutations that cause type I citrullinemia have been identified in the ASS gene. Most of these mutations substitute one amino acid for another in ASS. These mutations likely affect the structure of the enzyme and its ability to bind to citrulline, aspartate, and other molecules. A few mutations lead to the production of an abnormally short enzyme that cannot effectively play its role in the urea cycle.

Defects in ASS disrupt the third step of the urea cycle, preventing the liver from processing excess nitrogen into urea. As a result, nitrogen (in the form of ammonia) and other byproducts of the urea cycle (such as citrulline) build up in the bloodstream. Ammonia is toxic, particularly to the nervous system. An accumulation of ammonia during the first few days of life leads to poor feeding, vomiting, seizures, and the other signs and symptoms of type I citrullinemia.

Treatment for this defect includes a low-protein diet and dietary supplementation with arginine and phenylacetate.  Arginine allows the urea cycle to complete itself, creating the substrates needed to originally fix ammonia.  This will lower blood pH.  Additionally, phenylacetate reacts with backed-up glutamine, resulting on phenylacetoglutamine, which can be excreted renally.

Cancer 

A lack of argininosuccinate synthetase expression has been observed in several types of cancer cells, including pancreatic cancer, liver cancer, and melanoma. For example, defects in ASS have been seen in 87% of pancreatic cancers. Cancer cells are therefore unable to synthesize enough arginine for cellular processes and so must rely on dietary arginine. Depletion of plasma arginine using arginine deiminase has been shown to lead to regression of tumours in mice.

See also 
 Citrullinemia
 Urea cycle
 Synthetase

References

External links 
GeneReviews/NCBI/NIH/UW entry on Argininosuccinate Synthetase Deficiency; ASS Deficiency; Argininosuccinic Acid Synthetase Deficiency; CTLN1; Citrullinemia, Classic

EC 6.3.4
Urea cycle